Christopher Lamb (born 16 November 1982) is a British journalist who is the Rome Correspondent for Catholic publication The Tablet. He is a contributor to the Vatican Insider page of La Stampa and a regular commentator for the BBC on Vatican and religious affairs.

Lamb studied Theology at Durham University (University College), and then completed a postgraduate diploma in journalism at the London College of Communication. Before joining The Tablet he worked at The Daily Telegraph.

In 2020, Lamb published the book The Outsider in which he defends Francis' papacy against "guerrilla warfare" by Francis' conservative critics.

References 

1982 births
British journalists
British male journalists
Religion journalists
Alumni of the London College of Communication
Living people
Alumni of University College, Durham